The University of Ibadan (UI) is a public research university in Ibadan, Nigeria. The university was founded in 1948 as University College Ibadan, one of many colleges within the University of London. It became an independent university in 1962 and is the oldest degree-awarding institution in Nigeria. Through its graduate network, the University of Ibadan has contributed to the political, industrial, economic and cultural development of Nigeria. The history and influence of the University of Ibadan have made it one of the most prestigious universities in Africa.

The University of Ibadan is made up of 92 academic departments organized into 17 faculties, namely Arts, Science, Basic Medical Sciences, Clinical Sciences, Agriculture, the Social Sciences, Education, Veterinary Medicine, Pharmacy, Technology, Law, Public Health, Dentistry, Economics and Management Sciences, Renewable Natural Resources, Environmental Design and Management, and Multidisciplinary Studies. The Faculties of the Basic Medical Sciences, Clinical Sciences, Public Health and Dentistry are organized as a College of Medicine. The university has other academic units, among which are: Institute of Child Health, Institute of Education, Institute of African Studies, Centre for Child Adolescent and Mental Health, Centre for Entrepreneurship and Innovation (CEI), Institute for Advanced Medical Research and Training (IAMRAT), Institute of Cardiovascular Diseases, Centre for Drug Discovery, Development & Production (CDDDP) and Centre for Control & Prevention of Zoonosis (CCPZ). The recently established Infectious Diseases Institute (IDI), School of Business (UISB) and National Institute for Maternal, Child & Neonatal Health (NIMCNH) have commenced operation.

The University of Ibadan has 15 halls of residence that provide accommodation for about 30% of the population of students in the regular studies mode. Some of the popular halls in the university include Lord Tedder Hall, Kenneth Mellanby Hall, Sultan Bello Hall, Nnamdi Azikiwe Hall, Independence Hall, Tafawa Balewa Hall, Kuti Hall, Queen Idia Hall, Queen Elizabeth Hall and the Obafemi Awolowo Hall – which is the largest female hall in West Africa. The university has a total staff strength of 5,339, with 1,212 housing units for both senior and junior staff. The university has residential and sports facilities for staff and students on campus, as well as separate botanical and zoological gardens.

The university has educated many notable alumni, including a Nobel Laureate in Literature, eminent mathematicians, scientists, politicians, lawyers, business icons, philosophers, writers, monarchs, countless technocrats, recipients of the Nigerian National order of merit, Fellows of the various learned academies. In September 2016, it became the first Nigerian university to make the top 1000 in Times Higher Education rankings. Prior to that, it had always made the top 10 African Universities in Webometrics Rankings. UI is currently ranked No. 1 in Nigeria and 1196 in the world according to Webometrics.

History

The origins of the university are in the University of London. It was established in 1948 as the University College Ibadan, as a college of the University of London, which supervised its academic programmes and awarded degrees until 1967. The establishment came as a result of recommendation of the Asquith and the Elliot Commissions on Higher Education in the then British colonies, that two University Colleges of the University of London be set up in Ghana and Nigeria. Prior to 1948, Yaba College had been founded in 1932 in Yaba, Lagos, as the first tertiary educational institute in Nigeria, focused primarily on providing post-secondary vocational education and teacher training to Africans.

However, the limited aims of Yaba College and clamor by Nigerian nationalists for self-improvement and uninhibited education led to the establishment of University College Ibadan as the first university in Nigeria in 1948. Staff and students from Yaba Higher College were transferred to Ibadan to form the new University College Ibadan.

Modeled after the British university system, Kenneth Mellanby was appointed in 1947 as its first principal, and he started the university college on 18 January 1948. The sod of its permanent site was cut on 17 November 1948, and the date is now known as Founders' Day. The university's first buildings were designed by eminent modernist architects Maxwell Fry and Jane Drew. Following the tropical modernist style, the 1950s construction comprised administrative blocks, residential colleges and academic facilities.

Following Nigeria's independence in 1960 and subsequent drive to domesticate several institutions, UCI became a full-fledged independent university in early 1962 and the name changed to University of Ibadan.

In late 1963, on the university playing-fields, with a celebration marked by talking drums, the Rt. Hon. Sir Abubakar Tafawa Balewa, first Prime Minister of independent Nigeria, became the first Chancellor of its independent university. The first Nigerian vice-chancellor of the university was Kenneth Dike, after whom the university library is named.

Rankings and reputation

The university consistently ranks as the best in Nigeria.

Administration
The current principal members of the university administration are:

Faculties

 Agriculture and Forestry
 Arts
 Basic Medical Sciences
 Clinical Sciences
 Dentistry
 Education
 Law
 Pharmacy
 Public Health
 Science
 Technology
 The Social Sciences
 Veterinary Medicine
 Renewable Natural Resources
 Environmental Design and Management
 Economics

In August 2011, Ruqayyah Ahmed Rufa'i, the then Nigerian Minister of Education, announced that the University of Ibadan would host the Nigerian node of the Pan-African University, the Institute of Earth and Life Sciences.

A major arm of the College of Medicine (which comprises the faculties of Basic Medical Sciences, Clinical Sciences, Dentistry and Public Health) is located about five kilometres from the main university, within the structure of The University College Hospital. The college has a dormitory, the Alexander Brown Hall for students who are in their clinical years of study. The college was created in August 1980. Some of the past provosts are Oluwole Akande, Isaac Folorunso Adewole, and Akinyinka Omigbodun.

Institutes
 Institutes of African Studies
 IFRA-Nigeria (Institut français de recherche en Afrique) – an institute funded by the French government to promote research in the social sciences and the humanities, and improve collaborative work between academics in France and West Africa.
 Institute of Child Health
 Institute of Education
 Advanced Medical Research and Training
 Institute for Peace and Strategic Studies
 LES Institute of PAU

Centres of excellence
 Centre For Excellence in Teaching & Learning]
 Centre for Child & Adolescent Mental Health
 Centre for Control & Prevention of Zoonoses
 Center for Drug Discovery, Development and Production (CDDDP)

Affiliate institutions
Below is a list of affiliate institutions of the University of Ibadan, approved by the National Universities Commission.
 Bigard Seminary, Enugu, Enugu, State
 Archbishop Vining College of Theology, Akure
 St Augustine's College of Education Akoka, Lagos
 Osun State College of Education, Ilesa
 Federal College of Education, Osiele, Abeokuta, Ogun State.
 Federal College of Education (Special), Oyo, Oyo State.
 SS Peter And Paul Seminary, Bodija, Ibadan
 Immanuel College of Theology and Christian Education, Samonda, Ibadan
 Dominican Institute, Samonda, Ibadan
 ECWA Theological Seminary, Igbaja
 Nigeria Baptist Theological Seminary, Ogbomoso
 Life Seminary, Ikorodu
 Redeemed Bible College
 UMCA Seminary, Ilorin, Kwara
 Michael Otedola College of Primary Education, Epe Lagos State

Library
Among the notable structures in the university is the central Kenneth Dike Library, located just beside the Faculty of Arts. The library, which has a large capacity for students, contains books relating to virtually all fields of knowledge both in and outside the university community. To ensure its easy access, students are made to carry out their library registration in their first year of admission.

The Library is named after Professor Kenneth Dike, who was the first indigenous Principal and former Vice-Chancellor of the university. it was established out of the desires of the founding fathers and matriarch of the institution in order to cut a niche for research and sound teaching. Today, the library is ranked favourably among other   libraries in the Commonwealth of nations.

The library contains 700,000 volumes of information and more than 1,250 seats for readers. It is open to all senior staff, students of the institution, senior staff of the University College Hospital, (UCH) Ibadan as well as alumni of the university. The library will also admit anyone else with cogent reasons be it research, reference purposes, as well as study into the library on provision of letter of introduction from a recognized university official (i.e. dean of a faculty, head of department from the visitor's school or director of an organization).

Dispute with students' union 

On 29 May 2017, the management of the school stopped academic activities for undergraduate students. This was as a result of the protest by the student union. The student body was in disagreement with the school authorities over their failure to issue identity cards to the students and the outlaw on some electrical appliances. On 9 June, it was announced that school will be reopened on 20 June. The school resumed activities on 2 July.

Vice Chancellors 
The vice chancellors since 1947 include:
 Kenneth Mellanby (Principal): 1947 – 1953
 J. T. Saunders (Principal): 1953 – 1956
 J. H. Parry (Principal): 1956 – 1960
 Kenneth Dike (Principal/Vice Chancellor): 1960 – 1967
 Thomas Adeoye Lambo: 1968 – 1971
 Orishejolomi Thomas: December 1972 – November 1975
 Tekena Tamuno: December 1975 – November 1979
 Samson Olajuwon Kokumo Olayide: December 1979 – November 1983
 Ladipo Ayodeji Banjo (acting): November 1983 – November 1984
 Ladipo Ayodeji Banjo: December 1984 – November 1991
 Allen B. O. O. Oyediran: December 1991 – November 1995
 Oladosu A. Ojengbede (acting): December 1995 – March 1996
 Omoniyi O. Adewoye: March 1996 – September 2000
 Olufunso O. Olorunsogo (acting): March 2000 – September 2000
 Ayodele O. Falase: September 2000 – March 2004
 Olufemi Bamiro (acting): March 2004 – November 2005
 Olufemi Bamiro: December 2005 – November 2010
 Isaac Folorunso Adewole: December 2010 – November 2015
 Abel Idowu Olayinka: December 2015 – November 2020
 Adebola Babatunde Ekanola (acting): December 2020 – October 2021
 Kayode Adebowale: October 2021 until date

Notable alumni

 Abdulganiyu Abdulrasaq, lawyer, former President of the Nigerian Stock Exchange
 Mufutau Oloyede Abdul-Rahmon, Professor of Arabic and Islamic Studies.
 John Omoniyi Abiri, Nigerian academic
 Sadique Abubakar, former Nigeria Chief of Air Staff
 Chinua Achebe, novelist, author of Things Fall Apart Dapo Lam Adesina, Member of House of Representative for Ibadan North East/South Federal Constituency
 Adiele Afigbo, historian
 Ayandiji Daniel Aina, former Vice-Chancellor of Caleb University
 J. F. Ade Ajayi, Nigerian historian
 Wahab Adekola Akande, diplomat 
 Claude Ake, Professor of Political Economy, international scholar and social crusader
 Stephen Adebanji Akintoye
 Lola Akande, author and academic
 Grace Alele-Williams
 Elechi Amadi p. viii.
 Seth Amoama, Ghanaian Chief of the Defence Staff
 Alexander Animalu, Emeritus Professor, former Director National Mathematical Centre, Abuja
 Emeka Anyaoku, former Commonwealth Secretary-General
 Kayode Are, former National Security Adviser and former Director General of the State Security Service
 Ladipo Ayodeji Banjo, former Vice-Chancellor of the University of Ibadan
 Mosun Belo-Olusoga, financial expert
 Senator Robert Ajayi Boroffice
 Vivian E. Browne, visual artist
 J. P. Clark
 Sola David-Borha, Chief Executive (Africa Region) of Standard Bank
 Segun Toyin Dawodu, physician, attorney, academic, and entrepreneur who established the first website on socio-political issues of Nigeria.
 Adebayo Faleti(late), journalist, poet, actor and writer
 Kayode Fayemi, former Governor of Ekiti State, former Min of Solid Minerals
 Chukwuemeka Ike, writer
 Amadi Ikwechegh
 Abiola Irele
 Funmi Iyanda, Nigerian talk show host, broadcaster, journalist
 William Kumuyi, founder and General Superintendent of Deeper Christian Life Ministry
 Yahaya Kuta, author
 Eyitayo Lambo, Nigerian former Federal Minister of Health
 Mary Lazarus, Nigerian actress.
 Eddie Mbadiwe, Member of the House of Representative
 James Meredith, Civil Rights Movement figure
 Epaphras Denga Ndaitwah
 Aniebiet Inyang Ntui, EU Ambassador, University Librarian of University of Calabar and Professor of Library and Information Science. 
 Jerome Nriagu, Environmental chemist, academic and researcher
 Mark Nwagwu, academics and poet
 Adaobi Tricia Nwaubani
 Christopher Okigbo
 Ifeanyi Okowa, Governor of Delta State
 Isidore Okpewho
 Tunji Olaopa, founder and Executive Vice-Chairman, ISGPP
 Olufunmilayo Olopade
 Sophie Oluwole, philosopher
 Miriam Olusanya, first female managing director of GTB
 Akinyinka Omigbodun
 Michael Omolewa, former President of UNESCO General Conference and Ambassador of Nigeria to UNESCO
 Kole Omotosho
 Gamaliel Onosode
 Zakariyau Oseni
 Femi Osofisan, lecturer and playwright known for Women of Owu''
 Niyi Osundare
 Jude Rabo, Vice-Chancellor of Federal University, Wukari
 Ken Saro-Wiwa
 Kashim Shettima, Vice President-elect of Nigeria
 Fisayo Soyombo, investigative journalist
 Wole Soyinka, winner of the 1986 Nobel Prize in Literature
 Martin I. Uhomoibhi
 Farida Waziri
 Folashade Yemi-Esan, head of the civil service of the federation

Notable faculty

 Beatrice Aboyade, librarian
 Isaac Folorunso Adewole
 Rashid Adewumi Aderinoye
 Ladipo Ayodeji Banjo, Professor of English
 Ayo Bamgbose, Professor of Linguistics
 Jacob Ade Ajayi, Professor of History
 F. V. Atkinson, mathematician
 Olumbe Bassir, founding member of Biochemistry and Microbiology departments
 Christine Hamill, mathematician
 Rosemary Hutton, geophysicist and pioneer of magnetotellurics
 Molly Mahood, literary scholar
 Mark Nwagwu, Professor of Biology, and Fellow Nigerian Academy of Science
 Olakunbi Olasope, Professor of Classics
 Abel Idowu Olayinka
 Michael Omolewa, Professor of History and Adult Education
 Folake Onayemi, Professor of Classics and Head of the Department of Classics
 Ebun Oni, geophysicist
 Niyi Osundare
 H. F. C. Smith
 Wole Soyinka
 Grace Oladunni Taylor, biochemist, first African to win a L'Oréal-UNESCO Award for Women in Science and second female inducted into the Nigerian Academy of Science
 Fabian Udekwu, Professor of Surgery, first Nigerian cardiothoracic surgeon
 Duncan White

Gallery of campus

See also
 Diamond FM (Ibadan)
 List of universities in Nigeria

References

Sources

Further reading

External links

 

 
Educational institutions established in 1948
Public universities in Nigeria
1948 establishments in Nigeria
Buildings and structures in Ibadan
Medical schools in Nigeria
Universities and colleges in Ibadan